Sidarka de los Milagros Núñez (born June 25, 1984) is a volleyball player from the Dominican Republic, who played for the Women's National Team at the 2012 Summer Olympics in London. There her team ended up in fifth place. She claimed the gold medal at the 2008 Women's Pan-American Volleyball Cup in Mexico, where she was named Most Valuable Player of the tournament.

Núñez also won the 2013 Peruvian League Championship with Universidad César Vallejo, winning the season's Best Spiker award and the silver medal in the 2013 South American Club Championship.

Career
Playing with her National Junior Team, Núñez won the silver medal at the 2002 NORCECA Junior Championship.

In 2007-08 she played for Japanese volleyball team Ageo Medics. Playing the next season (2008/2009) for the Hitachi Sawa Rivale.

Núñez won the 2008 Pan-American Cup gold medal with the Dominican Republic National Team, and she was also awarded Most Valuable Player of the tournament. There, she set the record for most points in a single match in the Pan-American Cup with 37 points on June 30 against Brazil.

Playing in Chiapas, Mexico with her National Senior Team she won the 2010 Final Four Cup gold medal.

Núñez was part of the fifth-place finishers team that represented her country during the 2012 Summer Olympics. Her team lost to the USA team in the quarterfinals.

She signed to play the Peruvian National Superior League with the team Universidad César Vallejo. She won the league championship and the Best Spiker award for that season, qualifying to play the South American Club Championship. In the South American tournament, she won the silver medal.

Clubs
 Liga Juan Guzman (1997–1999)
 Naco (2000)
 Deportivo Nacional (2001)
 Los Prados (2002)
 Bameso (2004)
 Liga Juan Guzman (2005)
 Ageo Medics (2007–2008)
 Deportivo Nacional (2008)
 Hitachi Sawa Rivale (2008–2009)
 Mirador (2010)
 Indias de Mayagüez (2011)
 Universidad César Vallejo (2012-2013)
 Universidad César Vallejo (2014-2015)

Awards

Individuals
 2008 Pan-American Cup "Most Valuable Player"
 2013 Liga Nacional Superior de Voleibol Femenino "Best Spiker"

National Team

Junior Team
 2002 NORCECA Girls Youth Continental Championship U-18 -  Silver Medal

Clubs
 2012–13 Peruvian League -  Champion, with Universidad César Vallejo
 2013 South American Club Championship -  Runner-Up, with Universidad César Vallejo

References

External links
 FIVB profile
 Japan V-League profile

1984 births
Living people
Dominican Republic women's volleyball players
Volleyball players at the 2007 Pan American Games
Dominican Republic expatriates in Peru
Volleyball players at the 2012 Summer Olympics
Olympic volleyball players of the Dominican Republic
Central American and Caribbean Games gold medalists for the Dominican Republic
Competitors at the 2002 Central American and Caribbean Games
Opposite hitters
Expatriate volleyball players in Japan
Expatriate volleyball players in the United States
Expatriate volleyball players in Peru
Dominican Republic expatriate sportspeople in Japan
Dominican Republic expatriate sportspeople in the United States
Ageo Medics players
Central American and Caribbean Games medalists in volleyball
Pan American Games competitors for the Dominican Republic